Milena Mesa Matos (born 26 June 1993) is a Cuban handball player. She plays on the Cuba women's national handball team and participated at the 2011 World Women's Handball Championship in Brazil.

References

1993 births
Living people
Cuban female handball players
Handball players at the 2015 Pan American Games
Pan American Games competitors for Cuba